India has the 18th-largest exclusive economic zone (EEZ) with a total size of . It includes the Lakshadweep island group in the Laccadive Sea off the southwestern coast of India and the Andaman and Nicobar Islands at the Bay of Bengal and the Andaman Sea. India's EEZ is bordered to the west by Pakistan, to the south by the Maldives and Sri Lanka and to the east by Bangladesh, Myanmar, Thailand, Malaysia and Indonesia. Based on new scientific data, India has petitioned United Nations to extend its EEZ from 200 Nautical miles to 350 miles.

Legal framework 

India legally defined the concept of EEZ in the "Territorial Waters, Continental Shelf, Exclusive Economic Zone and Other Maritime Zones Act, 1976". In June 1997, India also ratified UNCLOS. India also enacted the "Maritime Zones of India (Regulation of fishing by foreign vessels) Act, 1981" prohibiting fishing by foreign vessel within Indian EEZ without a license. Additionally, India has also enacted laws regulation the fishing and fisheries by Indian fishing vessels operating in the EEZ.

Importance of EEZ
 

An EEZ provides a nation greater access to oil, natural gas, minerals, commercial fishing and other marine resources, freedom of navigation, international trade, national security, and strategic leverage over other nations. With 7,500 km coastline and an EEZ of over 2.3 million km2, India has exclusive control over the resources in its EEZ including navigation of seafaring trade and transport vessels in this area. As per 2014 study, India exploits only 3.2 million tonnes per year marine fishery resources out of potential 3.92 million tonne in its coastal areas.

Piracy, poaching or illegal fishing by foreign vessels, freedom of navigation, transgression of foreign vessels into Indian EEZ, and conflicting claims are major issues in EEZ. Piracy in the Strait of Malacca is a major concern for all the nations. Studies have shown decline in fishing stocks and destruction of several marine ecological areas in Indian EEZ due to organized illegal poaching and fishing resulting in depletion of many endangered and threatened species. Freedom of the navigation has become a cause of concern due to piracy. National security is also threatened by actions of China around Indian EEZ. Conflicting claims over EEZ by nations leads to disputes, such as India-Pakistan Sir Creek dispute. In the past, UNCLOS has granted several contradicting claims while increasing the EEZ based on the evidence related to the length of continental shelf. These UNCLOS contradictions have resulted into overlapping EEZ claims by several nations competing for the resources in the expanded EEZ.

Indian Coast Guard near the shore and Indian Military's integrated Andaman and Nicobar Command off-shore play the important role in protecting India's EEZ.

India's existing EEZ area

India's increased EEZ claim area 

In 2010, based on the new 6,000 pages sedimentary and scientific evidence, India petitioned United Nations for increasing Indian EEZ from 200 nautical miles to 350 nautical miles. Extension of EEZ from 200 to 350 nautical mile will almost double India's present EEZ. UNCLOS permits extension of EEZ beyond the usual 200 nautical miles limit, to a maximum of 350 nautical miles, if the evidence shows that continental shelf extends beyond 200 nautical miles. For the integrated management and mapping of the EEZ, India's Ministry of Earth Sciences (MoES) initiated an ongoing project in 1999 which was only 30% complete in 2018. A team of 60 scientists from several national institutes began undertaking multi-disciplinary studies on geo-scientific mapping, physiography, sedimentology, paleoclimatology and Himalayan tectonics, hydrology of India and monsoon of South Asia, mineral resource availability. Scientists and researchers involved in the studies come from several institutes and universities, such as the National Centre for Polar and Ocean Research (NCPOR), National Institute of Oceanography, India (NIO), National Institute of Ocean Technology (NIOT), Geological Survey of India (GSI) and many universities. These studies also enhance the preparedness against environmental hazards and socio-economic well-being of people living in Coastal India.

Neighbouring EEZs 

Neighbouring EEZ of other nations from west to east are:

See also 

 Climate of India
 Borders of India
 Disputed territories of India 
 Extreme points of India
 Geography of India
 Outline of India

References 

India
Borders of India
Economy of India